Pentwyn Halt railway station served the village of Pentwyn, in the historical county of Monmouthshire, Wales, from 1912 to 1941 on the Pontypool and Blaenavon Railway.

History 
The station was opened on 13 July 1912 by the Great Western Railway. It closed on 5 May 1941.

References 

Disused railway stations in Torfaen
Former Great Western Railway stations
Railway stations in Great Britain opened in 1913
Railway stations in Great Britain closed in 1941
1913 establishments in Wales
1941 disestablishments in Wales